Anatoly Mkrtchyan (6 October 1931 – 26 October 2012) was an Armenian politician who served as last Foreign Affairs of Minister of the Armenian SSR from 1986 to 1991.

References 

1931 births
2012 deaths
People from Gyumri
Ambassador Extraordinary and Plenipotentiary (Soviet Union)
Foreign ministers of Armenia